Sol Hurok (Solomon Israilevich Hurok; born Solomon Izrailevich Gurkov, Russian Соломон Израилевич Гурков; April 9, 1888March 5, 1974) was a 20th-century American impresario.

Early life
Hurok was born in Pogar, Chernigov Governorate, Russian Empire (in present-day Bryansk Oblast, Russia) in 1888, and moved to the United States in 1906, becoming a naturalized citizen in 1914.

Career
During Hurok's long career, S. Hurok Presents managed many performing artists, including Katherine Dunham, Marian Anderson, Irina Arkhipova, Vladimir Ashkenazy, Feodor Chaliapin, Nestor Mesta Chayres,<ref>[https://translate.google.com/translate?hl=en&sl=es&u=http://eglycolinamarinprimera.blogspot.com/2014/09/nestor-mesta-chayres-mejico.html&prev=search Nestor Mesta Chayres was one of the few popular artists to be represented by the office of Sol Hurok on translate.google.com]</ref> Van Cliburn, Isadora Duncan, Michel Fokine, Margot Fonteyn, Emil Gilels, Alexander Glazunov, Horacio Gutiérrez, Daniel Heifetz, Jerome Hines, Isa Kremer, Moura Lympany, Arturo Benedetti Michelangeli, David Oistrakh, Anna Pavlova, Jan Peerce, Andrés Segovia, Sviatoslav Richter, Manuela del Río, Mstislav Rostropovich, Arthur Rubinstein, Isaac Stern, Galina Vishnevskaya, Ralph Votapek, Efrem Zimbalist, and many others.

In 1935, Rubinstein introduced Hurok to singer Marian Anderson, who retained Hurok as her manager for the rest of her career. A few years later, with Walter White of the NAACP and First Lady Eleanor Roosevelt, Hurok was instrumental in persuading U.S. Secretary of the Interior Harold L. Ickes to arrange Anderson's Easter Sunday open-air concert on the steps of the Lincoln Memorial on April 9, 1939.

Beginning in the late 1930s Hurok managed Colonel W. de Basil's Original Ballet Russe, as well as its offshoot rival company, Sergei J. Denham's The Ballet Russe de Monte Carlo. They often performed near each other, and Hurok hoped to reunite the companies, but ultimately was unsuccessful.

In 1959, after 35 years of effort, Sol Hurok brought Russia's Bolshoi Ballet to the United States for an eight-week performance tour. In 1961, he brought Russia's Kirov Academy of Ballet and the Igor Moiseyev Ballet Company to the U.S. In 1962, he again brought the Bolshoi to the U.S. for a tour at the height of the Cuban Missile Crisis.

The First Moog Quartet, the first to perform electronic music in Carnegie Hall, was formed in 1970 in response to Hurok's request to hear the Moog synthesizer in a live concert.

In honor of Hurok's influence on American music, on December 4, 1971, he was awarded the University of Pennsylvania Glee Club Award of Merit. Beginning in 1964, this award was "established to bring a declaration of appreciation to an individual each year that has made a significant contribution to the world of music and helped to create a climate in which our talents may find valid expression."

In 1972, a bomb planted in Hurok's Manhattan office exploded, killing Iris Kones and injuring several others, including Hurok. While many people believe the  bombing had been arranged by the Jewish Defense League, a far-right terrorist organization which opposed the U.S. tours of artists from the Soviet Union, no one was ever convicted of the crime.

Death
In 1974, en route to a meeting with David Rockefeller to discuss a Rudolf Nureyev project, Hurok died of a heart attack. More than two thousand people nearly filled Carnegie Hall for his funeral, where Marian Anderson delivered the final eulogy.

 Cultural depictions 
 Tonight We Sing, musical biopic film by Mitchell Leisen; portrayed by David Wayne (1953)
 Anna Pavlova'', film by Emil Loteanu; portrayed by John Murray (1983).

References

External links

1888 births
1974 deaths
People from Bryansk Oblast
People from Chernigov Governorate
Russian Jews
Emigrants from the Russian Empire to the United States
American people of Russian-Jewish descent
Impresarios
Arts managers
Music promoters
Talent managers
Jews from the Russian Empire